Isaac Albéniz’s Suite española, Op. 47, is  a suite for solo piano. It is mainly composed of works written in 1886 which were grouped together in 1887, in honour of the Queen of Spain. Like many of Albeniz’s works for the piano, these pieces depict different regions and musical styles in Spain.

Origins of the suite
The work originally consisted of four pieces: Granada, Cataluña, Sevilla and Cuba.  The editor Hofmeister republished the Suite española in 1912, after Albéniz's death, but added Cádiz, Asturias, Aragón and Castilla.  The other pieces had been published in other editions and sometimes with different titles (Asturias was originally the prelude from the suite Chants d'Espagne).

The four pieces that Hofmeister added do not exactly reflect the geographical region to which they refer. A clear example of this is Asturias (Leyenda), whose Andalusian Flamenco rhythms have little to do with the Atlantic region of Asturias. Opus 47, the number assigned by Hofmeister, does not have any chronological relation to any of Albéniz’s other works, since the opus numbers of the pieces were randomly assigned by publishers and Albéniz himself. Despite the spurious nature of the Suite española, however, it has become one of the most performed of Albéniz's piano works, a favorite of both pianists and audiences.

The music
In these works the first title refers to the geographical region portrayed, and the title in parentheses is the musical form or dance from that region. From Granada in Andalusia there is a Serenata, from Catalonia a Curranda or Courante, from Sevilla a Sevillanas and from Cuba (which was still part of Spain in the 1880s) a Notturno in the style of a habanera, from Castile a seguidillas, from Aragon a Fantasia in the style of a jota, and from Cadiz a saeta. This last example, like Asturias (Leyenda), is geographically inaccurate.

Pieces
In the works constituting the Suite española, the first title makes reference to the region that each piece represents and the subtitle in brackets indicates the musical form of the dance of the region.

Granada (Serenade)
Cataluña (Courante)
Sevilla (Sevillanas)
Cádiz (Canción)
Asturias (Leyenda)
Aragón (Fantasía)
Castilla (Seguidilla)
Cuba (Nocturno)

The suite has been orchestrated by other hands, including a well-known version by Rafael Frühbeck de Burgos.  Arrangements of individual works and indeed the entire suite are often played in concert by classical guitarists.
In fact, "Granada", "Sevilla", "Cadiz" and "Asturias" are more often heard on guitar than in their original piano versions; all four have been staples of the guitar literature since early in the 20th century.  "Cataluña"  and "Cuba" became solo guitar staples in the 1980s.  The remaining pieces, "Aragón" and "Castilla," have been transcribed for guitar solo but are more often heard in multiple-guitar transcriptions.

Media

External links
 A free copy of the Suite can be downloaded from the International Music Score Library Project.
 Variations of Asturias by Carolina García and Pedro Gan
 Asturias by Edgardo Roffé
 Granada by Paulo López
 Sevilla by Edgardo Roffé
https://www.youtube.com/watch?v=6zrwCjjUqs0

Suite espanola (Albeniz)
Suites by Isaac Albéniz
1887 compositions
Orchestral suites